The 2023 Emperor's Cup (Emperor's Cup JFA 103rd Japan Football Championship (Japanese: 天皇杯 JFA 第103回全日本サッカー選手権大会)) will be the 103rd edition of the annually contested cup, starting on 20 May. The format for 2023 does not present any changes from the previous edition. It will as usual feature 88 teams representing the prefectural football associations, J1 League, J2 League and Japan Football League. The annually specially-designated amateur club are yet to be decided by the Japan Football League, whose chosen team will award a bye from the prefectural qualifications, being automatically seeded into the first round.

Ventforet Kofu are the defending champions, after an extraordinary run for the J2 club saw them qualify to the final, which they have won on penalty shoot-outs against Sanfrecce Hiroshima, despite most odds standing on Hiroshima's favour.

Calendar
The schedule for the first round to the quarter-finals was announced on 20 December 2022. The semi-finals and the Final did not have its dates released by the Japan Football Association, as uncertanties around the schedule of the 2023 AFC Asian Cup leaves doubts about a possible re-schedule of one or more rounds of the Emperor's Cup. The decision was also made to avoid schedule conflict for teams whose squad have one or more players participating in the competition.

Participating clubs
In parentheses: The amount of times each team qualified for the Emperor's Cup (appearance in the 2023 Emperor's Cup included)

Qualifying rounds
As only J1 and J2 League clubs qualify directly for the first round, teams from outside of it who wants to qualify to the Emperor's Cup (exception being made to the JFA-seeded team), have to undergo a prefectural qualification, with regulaments and schedules varying from one association to another. In total, there are 47 prefectural cup qualifications, with the winners of each prefectural cup earning their right to play in the Emperor's Cup, with all of them assigned to start the competition in the first round.

References

External links
Emperors Cup 2023, JFA.jp

Emperor's Cup
Japan
2023 in Japanese football